Igor Radovanović (born August 2, 1985 in Sarajevo) is a Bosnian-Herzegovinian retired football player..

Club career
After playing for clubs in Romania, Belgium and Slovenia, Radovanović joined Čelik Zenica in July 2015 and returned to his first club Slavija Sarajevo in February 2016. He then had a season with Sloga Simin Han and in summer 2017, he joined Swedish third tier side Ängelholms.

References

External links
 

1985 births
Living people
Footballers from Sarajevo
Association football forwards
Bosnia and Herzegovina footballers
Bosnia and Herzegovina under-21 international footballers
FK Slavija Sarajevo players
CS Pandurii Târgu Jiu players
K.V.K. Tienen-Hageland players
FK Željezničar Sarajevo players
CSM Ceahlăul Piatra Neamț players
NK Domžale players
FK Sloboda Tuzla players
NK Čelik Zenica players
FK Tuzla City players
Ängelholms FF players
Premier League of Bosnia and Herzegovina players
Challenger Pro League players
Liga I players
First League of the Federation of Bosnia and Herzegovina players
Ettan Fotboll players
Bosnia and Herzegovina expatriate footballers
Expatriate footballers in Belgium
Expatriate footballers in Romania
Expatriate footballers in Sweden
Bosnia and Herzegovina expatriate sportspeople in Romania